Women Grow is an organization founded in 2014 in Denver, Colorado focused on female leadership in the cannabis industry. The organization's primary goal is to turn legal cannabis into the first female-led, billion dollar industry.

History 
The organization was founded in 2014 by Jane West, and Jazmin Hupp with the mandate to connect, educate, and empower diverse leadership in the emerging legal cannabis industry. The organization has stated it aims to create "1,000 women-owned" cannabis companies.

Organization
The organization focuses on holding networking events, with notable speakers. Past events have featured speakers Congresswoman Eleanor Holmes Norton, and Dina Titus.

In 2016, Vice named the Toronto chapter one of the most influential organizations in the Canadian cannabis industry.

See also
 Women in the cannabis industry

References

2014 establishments in Colorado
2014 in cannabis
Cannabis in Colorado
Cannabis industry trade associations
Organizations established in 2014
Women in Colorado